The 76th ceremony of the Golden Globe Awards honored the best in film and American television of 2018, as chosen by the Hollywood Foreign Press Association. Produced by Dick Clark Productions and the HFPA, the ceremony was broadcast live on January 6, 2019, from the Beverly Hilton in Beverly Hills, California beginning at 5:00 p.m. PST / 8:00 p.m. EST. The ceremony aired live on NBC in the United States. Actors Sandra Oh and Andy Samberg hosted the ceremony.

The nominees were announced on December 6, 2018, by Terry Crews, Danai Gurira, Leslie Mann, and Christian Slater. The ceremony marked the debut of a new non-competitive award rewarding excellence in television, the Carol Burnett Award, with Carol Burnett herself being the inaugural recipient.

Green Book won the most awards for the ceremony with three, including Best Motion Picture – Musical or Comedy. Bohemian Rhapsody and Roma won two awards each. In television, The Kominsky Method and The Assassination of Gianni Versace: American Crime Story were the most awarded, with two awards each. Jeff Bridges was honored with the Cecil B. DeMille Award for career achievement.

Winners and nominees

Film 
{| class=wikitable style="width=100%"
|-
! colspan=2 | Best Motion Picture
|-
!style="width=50%" | Drama
!style="width=50%" | Musical or Comedy
|-

| valign="top" |
 Bohemian Rhapsody
 Black Panther
 BlacKkKlansman
 If Beale Street Could Talk
 A Star Is Born
| valign="top" |
 Green Book
 Crazy Rich Asians
 The Favourite
 Mary Poppins Returns
 Vice
|-
! colspan=2 | Best Performance in a Motion Picture – Drama
|-
! Actor
! Actress
|-
| valign="top" |
 Rami Malek – Bohemian Rhapsody as Freddie Mercury Bradley Cooper – A Star Is Born as Jackson Maine
 Willem Dafoe – At Eternity's Gate as Vincent van Gogh
 Lucas Hedges – Boy Erased as Jared Eamons
 John David Washington – BlacKkKlansman as Ron Stallworth
| valign="top" |
 Glenn Close – The Wife as Joan Castleman
 Lady Gaga – A Star Is Born as Ally Maine
 Nicole Kidman – Destroyer as Erin Bell
 Melissa McCarthy – Can You Ever Forgive Me? as Lee Israel
 Rosamund Pike – A Private War as Marie Colvin
|-
! colspan=2 | Best Performance in a Motion Picture – Musical or Comedy
|-
! Actor
! Actress
|-
| valign="top" |
 Christian Bale – Vice as Dick Cheney
 Lin-Manuel Miranda – Mary Poppins Returns as Jack
 Viggo Mortensen – Green Book as Frank "Tony Lip" Vallelonga
 Robert Redford – The Old Man & the Gun as Forrest Tucker
 John C. Reilly – Stan & Ollie as Oliver Hardy
| valign="top" |
 Olivia Colman – The Favourite as Queen Anne
 Emily Blunt – Mary Poppins Returns as Mary Poppins
 Elsie Fisher – Eighth Grade as Kayla Day
 Charlize Theron – Tully as Marlo Moreau
 Constance Wu – Crazy Rich Asians as Rachel Chu
|-
! colspan=2 | Best Supporting Performance in a Motion Picture
|-
! Supporting Actor
! Supporting Actress
|-
| valign="top" |
 Mahershala Ali – Green Book as Don Shirley
 Timothée Chalamet – Beautiful Boy as Nic Sheff
 Adam Driver – BlacKkKlansman as Flip Zimmerman
 Richard E. Grant – Can You Ever Forgive Me? as Jack Hock
 Sam Rockwell – Vice as George W. Bush
| valign="top" |
  Regina King – If Beale Street Could Talk as Sharon Rivers
 Amy Adams – Vice as Lynne Cheney
 Claire Foy – First Man as Janet Shearon Armstrong
 Emma Stone – The Favourite as Abigail Hill
 Rachel Weisz – The Favourite as Sarah Churchill
|-
! colspan=2 | Other
|-
! Best Director
! Best Screenplay
|-
| valign="top" |
 Alfonso Cuarón – Roma
 Bradley Cooper – A Star Is Born Peter Farrelly – Green Book Spike Lee – BlacKkKlansman Adam McKay – Vice| valign="top" |
 Brian Hayes Currie, Peter Farrelly, and Nick Vallelonga – Green Book
 Alfonso Cuarón – Roma Deborah Davis and Tony McNamara – The Favourite Barry Jenkins – If Beale Street Could Talk Adam McKay – Vice|-
! Best Original Score
! Best Original Song
|-
| valign="top" |
 Justin Hurwitz – First Man
 Marco Beltrami – A Quiet Place Alexandre Desplat – Isle of Dogs Ludwig Göransson – Black Panther Marc Shaiman – Mary Poppins Returns| valign="top" |
 "Shallow" (Lady Gaga, Mark Ronson, Anthony Rossomando, and Andrew Wyatt) – A Star Is Born
 "All the Stars" (Kendrick Lamar, SZA, Sounwave, and Al Shux) – Black Panther "Girl in the Movies" (Dolly Parton and Linda Perry) – Dumplin' "Requiem for a Private War" (Annie Lennox) – A Private War "Revelation" (Jónsi, Troye Sivan, and Leland) – Boy Erased|-
! Best Animated Feature Film
! Best Foreign Language Film
|-
| valign="top" |
 Spider-Man: Into the Spider-Verse Incredibles 2 Isle of Dogs Mirai Ralph Breaks the Internet| valign="top" |
 'Roma (Mexico)' Capernaum (Lebanon)
 Girl (Belgium)
 Never Look Away (Germany)
 Shoplifters (Japan)
|}

 Films with multiple nominations 
The following films received multiple nominations:

 Films with multiple wins 
The following films received multiple wins:

 Television 

 Series with multiple nominations 
The following television series received multiple nominations:

 Series with multiple wins 
The following two series received multiple wins:

Cecil B. DeMille Award
The Cecil B. DeMille Award is an honorary award bestowed for outstanding contributions to the world of entertainment. It is awarded to honorees who have made a significant mark in the film industry and is named after its first recipient, director Cecil B. DeMille.

 Jeff Bridges

Carol Burnett Award
The Carol Burnett Award was first awarded at this ceremony and is an honorary award given for outstanding and lasting contributions to television on or off the screen. It is named in honor of its first recipient.

 Carol Burnett

Golden Globe Ambassador
The Golden Globe Ambassador is a young person, generally a celebrity's daughter or son, who assists in the awards presentations.

 Isan Elba (daughter of Idris Elba)

Ceremony

Presenters
The following individuals presented awards at the ceremony:
 Bradley Cooper and Lady Gaga with Best Actor – Television Series Musical or Comedy
 Chadwick Boseman, Danai Gurira, Michael B. Jordan, and Lupita Nyong'o with Best Animated Feature Film and introduced Black Panther Olivia Colman, Emma Stone, and Rachel Weisz introduced The Favourite Kaley Cuoco, Johnny Galecki, and Jim Parsons with Best Actor – Television Series Drama and Best Television Series – Drama
 Adam Driver and John David Washington introduced BlacKkKlansman Taraji P. Henson and Gina Rodriguez with Best Supporting Actor – Series, Miniseries or Television Film
 Jamie Lee Curtis and Ben Stiller with Best Actress – Miniseries or Television Film
 Lucy Liu introduced Crazy Rich Asians Steve Carell with the Carol Burnett Award
 Idris Elba and Taylor Swift with Best Original Score and Best Original Song
 Octavia Spencer introduced Green Book Allison Janney and Sam Rockwell with Best Supporting Actress – Motion Picture
 Kristen Bell and Megan Mullally with Best Actress – Television Series Drama
 Amy Poehler and Maya Rudolph with Best Supporting Actor – Motion Picture and Best Screenplay
 Felicity Huffman and William H. Macy with Best Supporting Actress – Series, Miniseries or Television Film
 Saoirse Ronan with Best Actor – Motion Picture Musical or Comedy
 Antonio Banderas and Catherine Zeta-Jones with Best Foreign Language Film
 Tyler Perry introduced Vice Taron Egerton and Amber Heard with Best Actor – Miniseries or Television Film
 Chris Pine with the Cecil B. DeMille Award
 Harrison Ford with Best Director
 Sam Elliott introduced A Star Is Born Sterling K. Brown, Justin Hartley, and Chrissy Metz with Best Actress – Television Series Musical or Comedy and Best Television Series – Musical or Comedy
 Emily Blunt and Dick Van Dyke introduced Mary Poppins Returns Halle Berry and Lena Waithe with Best Miniseries or Television Film
 Jessica Chastain and Anne Hathaway with Best Actress – Motion Picture Musical or Comedy
 Janelle Monáe introduced If Beale Street Could Talk Mike Myers introduced Bohemian Rhapsody''
 Bill Murray with Best Motion Picture – Musical or Comedy
 Gary Oldman with Best Actress – Motion Picture Drama
 Richard Gere and Julianne Moore with Best Actor – Motion Picture Drama
 Nicole Kidman with Best Motion Picture – Drama

Broadcast
For the first time, NBC televised the 4:40 p.m. EST Sunday afternoon NFL Wild Card playoff game (which has historically gone to another NFL broadcast partner such as Fox) as a lead-in to the Golden Globes. Because of the large viewership of NFL playoff games, this was expected to boost the Golden Globes' TV ratings, which dropped 11% between 2017 and 2018. Despite the NFL lead-in, the Golden Globes achieved a lower household rating and less total viewers than the 2018 ceremony, though the show experienced a slight increase in the 18–49 demographic.

The regular Golden Globes Red Carpet Preshow was livestreamed exclusively on Facebook Watch instead of airing on NBC.

In Memoriam
No "In Memoriam" section was broadcast on television during the ceremony, so the HFPA included a slideshow on their website, and they included the following names:

 Penny Marshall
 Bernardo Bertolucci
 Stan Lee
 Neil Simon
 Burt Reynolds
 R. Lee Ermey
 Miloš Forman
 Steven Bochco
 Lewis Gilbert
 John Gavin
 John Mahoney

See also
 91st Academy Awards
 46th Annie Awards
 34th Independent Spirit Awards
 25th Screen Actors Guild Awards
 24th Critics' Choice Awards
 23rd Satellite Awards
 45th Saturn Awards

References

External links
 
 
 

2019 awards
Golden Globe
Golden Globe
Golden Globe
076
2019 in California
Golden Globe